John Tudor (born 1953) is a Welsh male former track cyclist.

Cycling career
Tudor became British champion when winning the British National Individual Sprint Championships in 1976.

He represented Wales at both the 1974 British Commonwealth Games and the 1978 Commonwealth Games.

References

1953 births
British male cyclists
British track cyclists
Welsh male cyclists
Living people
Cyclists at the 1974 British Commonwealth Games
Cyclists at the 1978 Commonwealth Games
Commonwealth Games competitors for Wales